Rosie Tucker is an American singer-songwriter from Los Angeles, California.  Pitchfork has acclaimed Tucker's "surging pop hooks and sharp lyricism."

History

A native of the San Fernando Valley, Tucker "grew up in a very Christian household and community." Tucker's mother grew up on a farm in Illinois, later becoming a computer programmer, and their father was a United States Marine who served in the Iraq War; the two met in a laundromat. Tucker started singing as a toddler, studied music at the University of Southern California, and in college grew disillusioned with organized religion. 

Tucker self-released their first full-length album in 2015 titled Lowlight. In 2019, Tucker announced their second full-length album, Never Not Never Not Never Not, which was released on New Professor Music. In 2021, Tucker announced they had signed to Epitaph Records. They also announced their third full-length album titled Sucker Supreme. The album was released on April 30, 2021. The album was listed on Pitchfork's list of "29 Great Records You May Have Missed: Spring 2021".

Personal life 
Tucker identifies as queer and uses they/them pronouns.

Discography

Studio albums 

 Lowlight (2015; independent)
 Never Not Never Not Never Not (2019; New Professor Music)
 Sucker Supreme (2021; Epitaph)

Remix albums 

 Sucker Supreme to study and relax to (Wolfy ft. Rosie Tucker) (2021; Epitaph)

Singles

Music videos

References

Queer musicians
Musicians from Los Angeles
Epitaph Records artists
American LGBT musicians
Non-binary musicians